The 1930–31 Hong Kong First Division League season was the 23rd since its establishment.

League table

References
1930–31 Hong Kong First Division table (RSSSF)
香港倒後鏡blog

1930–31 in Asian association football leagues
Hong Kong First Division League seasons
3